Spartan MK Gallactico Sylhet FC, simply known as MK Gallactico Sylhet, was a Bangladeshi football club based in Sylhet. It is mainly known for its women's team which competed in country's top-tier league Bangladesh Women's Football League. However, they didn't participate in the league after 2019-20 season.

It is a Bangladesh-England joint venture club. The club is associated wit  MK Gallacticos FC, which is situated in Milton Keynes & competes in an English league named Spartan South Midlands Football League.

History
MK Gallactico Sylhet Sports Academy was established in 2014 at Sylhet in association with MK Gallacticos FC, an English football club. It is a football & cricket based academy. More than 200 young girls & boys practices in the academy. They've several age levels teams both men's & women's, which take part in local leagues & tournaments.

In January 2020, the academy announced that they will participate in 2020 Bangladesh Women's League which is resuming after seven years. The women's team name will be 'Spartan MK Gallactico Sylhet FC'. They announced Liakot Ali, an AFC 'A' license holder, as head coach of the women's team. They formed their squad for the league with their academy graduates.

Record

Head coach

Personnel

Current technical staff
As of January 2020

Board of directors
As of January 2020.

BWFL position by years
BWFL, 2020: 6 of 7, 2021: Did not participate.

References

Women's football clubs in Bangladesh
Association football clubs established in 2014
2014 establishments in Bangladesh